Rafael Cuevas Sánchez (born 16 June 1980) is a Mexican retired football goalkeeper. He is currently the goalkeeper coach for Club America's first team under Ricardo LaVolpe.

He is known to teammates and fans as "Higuita", due to his resemblance to Colombian goalkeeper René Higuita.

Honors

Club
Atlante F.C.
 Apertura 2007

See also
List of people from Morelos, Mexico

External links
 

1980 births
Living people
Footballers from Morelos
People from Jiutepec
Association football goalkeepers
Atlante F.C. footballers
Mexican footballers